Vladimir Alexandrovich Sterzhakov (born June 6, 1959) is a Soviet and Russian actor of theater and cinema.

Biography
Since 1981 to 2001 he worked at the Moscow Art Theater.

Selected filmography 

 1986 Plumbum, or The Dangerous Game as bartender
 1990 Enemy of the People – Bukharin as  Mikhail Koltsov
 1990 Taxi Blues as  Musician in the Taxi
 1995 Fatal Eggs as Morzhansky
 1996 The Return of the Battleship as  Lyubim Avdeyevich Polishchuk
 2000 House for the Rich as architect
 2005  Not by  Bread Alone as Ganichev
 2007  Valery Kharlamov. Overtime as Anatoly Tarasov
 2011-2012 Daddy's Daughters as Anton Stepanovich, director
 2011   Comrade Stalin as Kliment Voroshilov
 2013 Metro as Head of Moscow Metro
 2014 Molodezhka as Semyon Valerievich Krasnitskiy, sports manager
 2014 Spiral as Mikhail, lawyer
 2018 Yolki 7 as train manager

References

External links

 Владимир Стержаков на сайте «РусКино»
  Владимир Александрович Стержаков

1959 births
Soviet male film actors
Soviet male television actors
Soviet male stage actors
Russian male film actors
Russian male television actors
Russian male stage actors
Russian male voice actors
Male actors from Tallinn
Male actors from Moscow
Living people
20th-century Russian male actors
21st-century Russian male actors
Moscow Art Theatre School alumni